The Gidrosamlet Che-24, 26 and 29 are closely related light flying boats designed and built in Russia from 2010.

Design and development

The Ch-24, Che-26 and Che-29 are braced, parasol wing monoplane flying boats, which differ in the number and type of engines and in their seat numbers. The wings are identical, with no sweep and constant chord out to trapezoidal, upturned tips.  Full span, slotted flaperons are fitted. There are two streamlined bracing struts on each side, one from mid-fuselage to about one third span and a shorter, more vertical one from higher on the fuselage.  These are assisted by further light struts bracing the rear of the wing centre section via the cabin roof.  The engines, one placed centrally on the Ch-24 and two on the other variants are all mounted above and forward of the wing leading edge. The fin, integral with the fuselage, and balanced rudder are swept, tapered and generous. The tailplane is mounted midway up the fin, externally braced from below. Both the rudder and elevators have electrically powered trim tabs.

The fuselage, a two step hull design, is a fibreglass structure on all models with the glazed cabin well below the wing underside. The two seat Che-24 and Che-26 have the same length, side by side seats and upward opening doors. The Che-29 is  longer and has a second pair of seats behind the first.  Fixed wing tip floats, each mounted on parallel pairs of struts, provide stability on water where a water rudder under the fin is used for manoeuvring. All types have the option of an amphibious conventional undercarriage; the small mainwheels are on short cantilever legs which can be rotated upwards out of the water.

Variants
Data from Jane's All the World's Aircraft 2013-4 pp. 522–4
Che-24 Original version, as described below with single Rotax engine and two seats. First flown 18 October 2010.
Che-26 Twin engines, with a choice between  twin cylinder inline Sauer S650 or  Rotax 582.  Empty weight as amphibian, . Two seats.
Che-29 Twin engines, with a choice between  Rotax 912 ULS or  Subaru EJ25 water-cooled flat fours.   longer than the Che-24 and -26 and  heavier empty (Rotax 912 version) than the Che-26, with four seats. First flown 4 November 2011.

Specifications (Che-24)

References

External links

Parasol-wing aircraft
Amphibious aircraft
2010s Russian civil aircraft
Aircraft first flown in 2010